Sibling Rivalry Press is a small press publishing house based in Little Rock, Arkansas founded by Bryan Borland in 2010. It features both online and print components as well as the non-profit SRP Foundation, which financially supports the arts.

History
Bryan Borland originally conceived of Sibling Rivalry Press as a vanity press through which to disseminate his personal collection of poetry, but decided to expand it to encompass other authors whose work focused on similar themes. Authors since published by Sibling Rivalry Press include Ocean Vuong, Michael Klein, Saeed Jones, Kaveh Akbar, Kazim Ali, Franny Choi, Matthew Hittinger, Dorothy Allison, Raymond Luczak, Bushra Rehman, and "Lambda Literary Award Winner and Thom Gunn Award for Gay Poetry Finalist" Stephen S. Mills.

Accolades
The SRP website describes its purpose as catering to queer writers of poetry, albeit not exclusively. In 2014, The American Library Association honored nine "of SRP's titles...on its annual list of recommended LGBT reading."

References

External links

Publishing companies established in 2010
LGBT book publishing companies
Poetry publishers
2010 establishments in Arkansas
LGBT poetry